Andy White (born 6 November 1981) is an English footballer. He is 6 foot 4 inches and weighs 14 stone.

He played his first football at Hucknall Town, before being signed by Stuart Watkiss at Mansfield Town. He was loaned out to various clubs including Boston United, Crewe Alexandra, Kidderminster Harriers and Burton Albion. He was released, by the then manager, Keith Curle and then joined Championship side Crewe Alexandra. When he was released by Crewe, Gudjon Thordarson signed him for Notts County.

In June 2006 White re-joined Kidderminster Harriers on a one-year contract. In March 2007 he joined Stafford Rangers on a short-term loan deal. White was then released by Kidderminster at the end of the 2006-07 season.
White joined Alfreton Town F.C. at the start of the 2007-2008 season, linking up with ex-Chesterfield and Bradford City manager Nicky Law. He soon moved on to Worksop Town. In May 2009 he signed a new contract for Worksop Town which was expected to run for two seasons, but was released in 2010 

After leaving Worksop, White went onto play amateur  football in the, step seven, Central Midlands Football League with Sutton Town A.F.C. and Swanwick Pentrich Road FC. Now runs the line

References

1981 births
Living people
English footballers
Mansfield Town F.C. players
Crewe Alexandra F.C. players
Boston United F.C. players
Kidderminster Harriers F.C. players
Notts County F.C. players
Hucknall Town F.C. players
Stafford Rangers F.C. players
Alfreton Town F.C. players
Worksop Town F.C. players
Footballers from Derby
Association football forwards